Záboří nad Labem is a municipality and village in Kutná Hora District in the Central Bohemian Region of the Czech Republic. It has about 800 inhabitants.

Administrative parts
The village of Habrkovice is an administrative part of Záboří nad Labem.

Geography
It lies mostly in a flat landscape of the Central Elbe Table, only a small part of the municipal territory in the northwest exnteds into the Iron Mountains. It is situated at the confluence of the Elbe and Doubrava rivers.

History
The first written mention of Záboří nad Labem is from 1338, when the village was owned by the Sedlec Abbey. During the Hussite Wars, the abbey was burned down, and Záboří nad Labem was annexed to the Kolín estate in 1436. That lasted until 1636, when the village was acquired by marriage by Bedřich Kašpar Švihovský and annexed to the Nové Dvory estate.

Sights
The landmark of Záboří nad Labem is the Church of Saint Procopius. It was originally a Romanesque church from the mid-12th century, rebuilt in the early Baroque style. Next to the church is a separate wooden bell tower.

References

External links

Villages in Kutná Hora District